Dibamus bourreti, also known commonly as Bourret's blind skink, the white-tailed dibamid, or the white-tailed worm-like lizard, is a species of legless lizard in the family Dibamidae. The species is endemic to Asia.

Etymology
The specific name, bourreti, is in honor of French herpetologist René Léon Bourret.

Geographic range
D. bourreti is found in China and Vietnam.

Habitat

Behavior
D. bourreti is terrestrial and fossorial.

Reproduction
D. bourreti is oviparous.

References

Further reading
Angel F (1935). "Un lézard nouveau de la familie des dibamidés ". Bulletin du Muséum national d'Histoire naturelle, Paris, Séries 2, 7: 354–356. (Dibamus bourreti, new species). (in French).

Dibamus
Reptiles of China
Reptiles of Vietnam
Reptiles described in 1935